Scott Kendall (born 1959) is an alpine skier from New Zealand.

In the 1980 Winter Olympics at Lake Placid, he came 26th in the Slalom.

His brother Brett Kendall competed at the 1976 Winter Olympics.

References

External links  
 
 

Living people
1959 births
New Zealand male alpine skiers
Olympic alpine skiers of New Zealand
Alpine skiers at the 1980 Winter Olympics